Why Korea? is a 1950 American short documentary film produced by Edmund Reek at the request of the Secretary of Defense Louis Johnson and used newsreel footage to explain the Korean War. In 1951, it won an Oscar for Documentary Short Subject at the 23rd Academy Awards. The Academy Film Archive preserved Why Korea? in 2005.

Cast
 Joe King as Narrator

References

External links

1950 films
1950 documentary films
1950 short films
1950s short documentary films
American short documentary films
American black-and-white films
20th Century Fox short films
Best Documentary Short Subject Academy Award winners
Documentary films about the Korean War
1950s English-language films
1950s American films